Two Hands is a 1999 Australian comedy crime film written and directed by Gregor Jordan. The film stars Heath Ledger as Jimmy, a young man in debt to Pando, a local gangster played by Bryan Brown, and also stars Rose Byrne, David Field, and Susie Porter. It won the Australian Film Institute Award for Best Film in 1999. It was filmed in 1998 but was not released in Australia until 29 July 1999. Before its release, it was screened at the Sundance Film Festival in the United States but was not released to DVD in the US until December 2005.

At the ARIA Music Awards of 1999 the soundtrack was nominated for Best Original Soundtrack Album.

Plot 
Jimmy, while working as bouncer at a strip club in Kings Cross, is approached by local mob boss Pando who says he has work for him. Pando gives Jimmy $10,000 to deliver to a woman in Bondi, and when she appears not to be home, he goes for a swim on the beach. Unfortunately the $10,000 is stolen by two street kids while he is swimming, leaving him heavily indebted to the furious Pando and his gang. The street kids, Pete (Evan Sheaves) and Helen (Mariel McClorey), go on a spending spree with their newfound wealth.

The car Jimmy was using on the job—a Ford Falcon belonging to Pando's associate Acko—is stolen by a young man and taken to a mechanic with the intention of selling it. The mechanic happens to be a friend of Acko's, who, displeased at the news of his car being stolen, suspects Jimmy's involvement. Acko arrives to recover the car but on the way there his car hits and kills street kid Pete. Helen watches in disbelief as Acko simply picks the dead boy's body off the street and dumps it in the gutter, concerned more about the damage to his car. He drives off leaving Helen alone, crying by her dead friend.

Jimmy comes up with a plan to pay off the debt by robbing a bank the next day in Bankstown along with two others. The night before he arranges to meet new friend and love interest Alex (Rose Byrne) at a pub. Unfortunately the meeting's arrangements are heard by Les, a friend jealous of Alex's attraction to Jimmy and keen to get in with Pando's gang. After Les informs the gang of the couple's whereabouts, Jimmy is forced to flee the pub with Alex, attempting to escape on the Sydney Monorail, however the escape proves unsuccessful and Jimmy is taken to a remote location where the gang plan to kill him. Through the indirect intervention of Jimmy's dead brother (who acts as a guardian angel figure throughout the film), Jimmy is able to escape and make his way back home to prepare for the bank robbery.

The robbery is not without its problems. When returning with the cash bags, one of the men attempts to jump over the bank counter, but fails and lands unconscious on the bank floor. He is dragged by Jimmy into the car, and comes round just as the police begin shooting and returns fire. The getaway driver is killed by the police but the robbery is on the whole successful. Jimmy gets the money he needs, escaping in a stolen Toyota Celica with his remaining accomplice. The stolen auto's radio station bumper sticker is spotted by that station's competition team, who give chase attempting to award Jimmy a $10,000 prize. Not wanting to be identified after the robbery, Jimmy rams them off the road.

Jimmy returns to Pando's office to pay off his debt, but thinking he has a gun the gang once again attempt to kill him. He is able to give them the money, and is offered more work by Pando as a result. Jimmy leaves in disgust after pulling a gun on Pando. As Jimmy leaves, Helen the street kid passes Jimmy, and in retaliation for the death of her friend Pete she shoots Pando and his gang dead. The movie ends with Jimmy and Alex buying tickets at an airport to 'The North Coast' away from the pressures of life in Sydney.

Alternate Versions
Two main cuts of the film exist; both are on file at the National Film and Sound Archive of Australia.

The original cut of the film ran for 103 minutes (99 min. PAL), however, after its premiere at the Sundance Film Festival in January 1999, the director made a number of trims and cuts, particularly to scenes involving Jimmy's dead brother. Subsequently, the commonly available version of the film runs for 93 minutes (89 min. PAL) and is sometimes erroneously referred to as the "Director's Cut", despite being the version ultimately released theatrically in Australia and on home video overseas. Some German releases were also further cut for censorship reasons.

Nevertheless, the original cut of the film does occasionally surface on TV, and UK & Scandinavian VHS and DVD releases are also the longer cut.

Cast

 Heath Ledger as Jimmy
 Bryan Brown as Pando
 David Field as Acko
 Tom Long as Wally
 Steve Vidler as The Man
 Dale Kalnins as Kiwi Bob
 Kiri Paramore as Les
 William Drury as Jesus Freak
 Mathew Wilkinson as Rocket
 Rose Byrne as Alex
 Mariel McClorey as Helen (Short Haired Girl)
 Susie Porter as Deirdre

Soundtrack
The soundtrack featured the Powderfinger single "These Days," the video for which was compiled with footage from Two Hands. Other songs were mostly contributed by Australian artists. Cezary Skubiszewski also contributed original music to the soundtrack

Track listing

"These Days" by Powderfinger
"Lucky Star" by Alex Lloyd
"Walking Kings X" by Cezary Skubiszewski
"What Does it Matter" by Primary
"Stadium" by Skunkhour
"Dark State of Mind" by Tuatara
"Belter" by Powderfinger
"Staircase" by Cezary Skubiszewski
"Down in Splendour" by Straitjacket Fits
"Heavenly Sublime" by Tracky Dax
"Fletcher's House" by Cezary Skubiszewski
"Two Hands" by Kate Ceberano
"Love Theme" by Cezary Skubiszewski
"This Guy's in Love" by The Reels
"Kare Kare" by Crowded House

Reception
The film garnered mostly positive reviews from critics, with a 71% Fresh rating on Rotten Tomatoes. Joel Meares, from FilmCritic.Com, praised director Gregor Jordan, saying, "Jordan, here in his firecracker of a debut, has created a fast moving, and ultimately genuinely moving film." Scott Weinburg, of DVDTalk.Com, stated, "Boasts Jordan's slick and efficient film making, two excellent performances by Ledger and Brown, and that always-welcome air of offbeat Aussie attitude." On its release in July 1999, many critics were calling it the "Australian Goodfellas." Pete Cascaldi, from ABC.net, claimed, "Two Hands is a beautifully written and executed, fast and sexy street-wise romp through inner city villainy. Sporting the perfect cast, it's the story of innocence and the 'hardway' colliding with a mix of brutality, gentility and just a little mysticism" and praising the director, "Jordan delivers in Two Hands a tale that will more than tickle your fancy and touch your heart."

Awards and nominations

AFI Awards:
Won: Best Film
Won: Best Director (Gregor Jordan)
Won: Best Supporting Actor (Bryan Brown)
Won: Best Original Screenplay (Gregor Jordan)
Won: Best Film Editing (Lee Smith)
Nominated: Best Achievement in Costume Design
Nominated: Best Achievement in Sound
Nominated: Best Original Music Score
Nominated: Best Actor (Heath Ledger)
Nominated: Best Supporting Actress (Susie Porter)

Film Critics Circle of Australia Awards
Won: Best Film
Won: Best Supporting Actress (Susie Porter)
Won: Best Supporting Actor (Bryan Brown)
Nominated: Best Actor – Male (Heath Ledger)
Nominated: Best Cinematography
Nominated: Best Director (Gregor Jordan)
Nominated: Best Music Score
Nominated: Best Screenplay (Gregor Jordan)

Stockholm Film Festival
 Nominated: Bronze Horse (Gregor Jordan)

Queensland Premier's Literary Awards
 Won: Film Script – the Pacific Film and Television Commission Award (Gregor Jordan)

Box office
Two Hands grossed $5,478,485 at the box office in Australia in 1999.

See also
Cinema of Australia

References

External links
 
 
 
Two Hands at Oz Movies
 Two Hands at the National Film and Sound Archive

APRA Award winners
Australian action comedy films
1999 films
Films set in Sydney
1999 independent films
1999 action comedy films
1990s crime comedy films
1999 romantic comedy films
Films directed by Gregor Jordan
Films shot in Sydney
Films about organised crime in Australia
Australian independent films
Australian crime comedy films
Australian romantic comedy films
1999 directorial debut films
1990s English-language films